"On Your Side" is a song recorded by Australian pop duo The Veronicas for their fifth studio album Human. The Veronicas twins, Lisa Origliasso and Jessica Origliasso, co-wrote the song with Wayne Hector and Jim Eliot, while Swedish record producer Ollipop and Freddy Haggstam produced the track. It was released through Sony Music on 14 October 2016 as the album's first single.

Composition
"On Your Side" is a synth-pop and EDM song written by The Veronicas (Jessica Origliasso and Lisa Origliasso) with British songwriters Wayne Hector and Jim Eliot. It was written and recorded in London, England and produced by Swedish record producer Ollipop. Critics have also noted influences of reggaeton and tropical house in song's musical styling.

Lyrically, the song is about wishing an ex-lover happiness in spite of the heartache caused by the relationship ending. "After you have loved and lived through different relationships," Jessica Origliasso said in explanation of the song's meaning, "you reach a place where there's a certain amount of acceptance that the love that you shared still exists even if the relationship doesn't."

Reception
Robbie Daw of Idolator gave the song a positive review in which he noted the song's potential as a breakthrough in the US market. "This isn’t the sound you’d typically associate with the Origliasso twins," writes Daw, "but somehow, some way, Lisa and Jess just seem to get better and better with each release."

Music video
The music video for the song written and directed by Ruby Rose was released to YouTube on 17 November 2016. It depicts a romantic relationship dealing with addiction.

Track listing
Digital download
 "On Your Side" – 2:51

CD single
 "On Your Side" – 2:51
 "In My Blood" (Leaf remix) – 3:28

Charts

Certifications

Release history

References

2016 songs
2016 singles
The Veronicas songs
Sony Music singles
Songs written by Lisa Origliasso
Songs written by Jessica Origliasso
Songs written by Wayne Hector
Songs written by Jim Eliot